Empress Han (1165 – 14 December 1200) was the empress consort of Emperor Ningzong during the Song Dynasty.

Biography
Han was born in modern-day Henan, the descendant of a prominent Northern Song official. She became a concubine of Ningzong along with her older sister. She was selected as the primary consort of Ningzong, and appointed his empress after his succession. 
Empress Han and her family managed to attain influence over the affairs of state, backed by the so called 'War party', succeed in persuading Ningzong to depose and disgrace senior minister Zhao Ruyu and replaced him with her militarist relative, Han Tuozhou.

References

Notes

Works cited

1200 deaths
Song dynasty empresses
1165 births
12th-century Chinese women
12th-century Chinese people